The RKO Radio Network, a subsidiary of RKO General, was the first commercial radio network to distribute  programming entirely by satellite.  When it began operations on October 1, 1979, the initial RKO network was the first new full-service American radio network in 40 years. Satellite distribution allowed high-fidelity (15 kHz) stereo programming to its affiliates.

News and programming

The newscasts, aimed at a young adult audience, had a conversational, high-energy style developed by co-founders Vice President and News Director Dave Cooke, and Vice President of Programming Jo Interrante.  

RKO was popular from the start, signing up hundreds of affiliates coast to coast. Its base was the RKO General-owned radio stations in New York, Los Angeles, San Francisco and other large markets. RKO initially purchased downlink satellite dishes for its affiliates, creating the nation's first satellite-delivered commercial radio network. 

The original network, which fed newscasts at :50 repeated at :00, became known as RKO 1 when RKO 2 debuted on September 1, 1981, at which point the two collectively became RKO Radio Networks. RKO 2 fed newscasts at :20 repeated at :30 and was aimed at an older audience. Both networks offered sportscasts, music, public affairs programming and closed-circuit affiliate feeds of news and sports correspondent reports and news-maker actualities.

The networks were home to three groundbreaking long-form programs. NightTime America with Bob Dearborn was the first live, daily, satellite-delivered music show in radio history. Dearborn produced and hosted the five-hour adult contemporary show from January 9, 1981, until 1984. January 9, 1981, was also the premier of  America Overnight, a six-hour interview and call-in show hosted by Eric Tracey in Los Angeles and Ed Busch from Dallas. It was the first national talk show delivered by satellite. It also marked the first time a network offered simultaneous overnight programs. Dick Bartley created, produced and hosted the first live national oldies radio show, Solid Gold Saturday Night.

Headquarters
The RKO Radio Networks were headquartered at 1440 Broadway in New York City, also the home of co-owned WOR (AM). The offices were the former headquarters of the Mutual Broadcasting System when RKO General owned Mutual. RKO also staffed news bureaus in Washington, D.C., and London.

Notable events

Last John Lennon interview

The network aired the last interview with John Lennon, recorded at The Dakota just hours before his death on December 8, 1980, by Dave Sholin, a San Francisco DJ, and scriptwriter/newscaster Laurie Kaye, with radio producer Ron Hummel, who put together many music specials for RKO.

Billing scandal and sale
 
After advertising billing scandals involving RKO's television stations and later the radio networks came to light, the RKO Radio Networks were sold in 1985 to the United Stations Radio Network. United Stations was merged with Transtar Radio Networks to form Unistar Radio Networks in 1987. Unistar was absorbed by Westwood One in 1994 and its affiliates were switched to the Mutual Broadcasting System.

Staff 

Among RKO Radio Network alumni are
 Les Coleman - White House correspondent (later CBS & ABC News London) 
Diane Dimond - Washington correspondent (later Court TV and Hard Copy)
Gil Gross - news anchor (later with CBS Radio and ABC Radio)
Keith Olbermann - sports anchor (later MSNBC anchor)
Steve Powers - news anchor (later WNYW-TV anchor)
Charley Steiner - sports anchor (later ESPN anchor and Los Angeles Dodgers radio announcer)
Nick Young - news anchor (later CBS Radio anchor)
Kevin Gordon - news anchor (later NBC Radio Network news anchor and New York Times radio news anchor and classical music host)
Gary McKenzie -news anchor (later with CBS Radio Networks and Business Talk Radio Network)

See also
 RKO General
 Transtar Radio Networks
 United Stations Radio Networks

RKO General
Defunct radio networks in the United States
Radio stations established in 1979
Radio stations disestablished in 1985
Defunct radio stations in the United States